Peachocaris is a genus of extinct crustaceans in the order Lophogastrida containing at least two species. Peachocaris were small shrimp-like crustacean that lived in the shallow seas of the late Carboniferous (Pennsylvanian). The species Peachocaris strongi is found in the Mazon Creek fossil beds, a carboniferous lagerstätte in Illinois.

The genus was named by Frederick Schram in 1974. It is named after the British paleontologist Ben Peach who provided significant contributions to the early study of Carboniferous Malacostraca.

See also
 List of prehistoric malacostracans

References

Prehistoric Malacostraca
Prehistoric crustacean genera
Carboniferous crustaceans
Carboniferous animals of North America